Anneke Brassinga (born 20 August 1948, in Schaarsbergen, Gelderland) is a Dutch writer and translator. She was awarded the Constantijn Huygens Prize in 2008, and has received numerous other prizes as well.

Life and career
Brassinga studied Translation Studies in Amsterdam. She works as a literary translator, and has translated the works of the following authors into Dutch: George Orwell, Oscar Wilde, Vladimir Nabokov, Samuel Beckett, Sylvia Plath,  Patricia Highsmith, W.H. Auden, Hermann Broch, Jean Jacques Rousseau, Marcel Proust, and Jules Verne.

She is considered a postmodern writer, but she prefers to see herself as surrealist. The themes of her poetry are nature, love, the vulnerability of beauty and language.

Works

Poetry 
Aurora (1987)
Landgoed (1989)
Thule (1991)
Zeemeeuw in boomvork (1994)
Huisraad (1998)
Verschiet (2001)
Timiditeiten (2003) 
Wachtwoorden. Verzamelde herziene gedichten, 1987-2003. (2005)(with cd)
 Wachtwoorden. Verzamelde herziene gedichten, 1987-2015. (2015)
IJsgang (2006)
Ontij (2010)
Het wederkerige (2014)
Verborgen tuinen (2019)

Prose 
Hartsvanger (1993)
Hapschaar (1998, 2018) - short stories
Het zere been (2002) - essays 
Tussen vijf en twaalf (2005) - letters
Bloeiend puin (2008) - essays
as co-author: Het zere been: essays & diversen (2015) 
Grondstoffen (2015) - essays

Awards
 2015: P.C. Hooft Award for her poetry
 2008:Constantijn Huygens Prize for her overall oeuvre
 2005:Anna Bijns Prize for Timiditeiten
 2002:VSB Poetry Award for Verschiet
 2002:Ida Gerhardt Poëzieprijs for Verschiet
 2001:ECI Prize
 2001:Paul Snoek Prize for Huisraad
 1990:Herman Gorter Prize for Landgoed
 1985:Trevanian Poetry Prize

References
Profile at the Koninklijke Bibliotheek, National Library of the Netherlands
Profile at the Digital Library for Dutch Literature

1948 births
Living people
People from Arnhem
Dutch translators
Constantijn Huygens Prize winners
English–Dutch translators
French–Dutch translators